MTSA Consultancy
Established in 2015 By Eng. Mehmet Samancioglu
  Technical and business consultancy; Provides advice on compressor selection & upgraded piston sealing design & materials-polymer alloys, Lubrication system, Compressor Valves, Engineering Training courses and advisory services to Compressor OEM in new, investment, business development, projects, technology transfer, representing in the Turkish market & Middle East. Use our extensive expertise in rotating equipment in the reduction of technical and commercial risk, prior to waste of your valuable time and money. We specialised in improving equipment reliability, performance, and optimisation. With over 30 years of experience in reciprocating and centrifugal compressors, pumps & steam turbine. Analyse technical problems for clients and develop project plans for how to solve them.
The initials MTSA could stand for:
 
 Metropolitan Travel Survey Archive
 Mobile Telecommunications Sourcing Act
 Maritime Transportation Security Act of 2002
 Methylated-thiol-coenzyme M methyltransferase, an enzyme